Maureen Macmillan (born 9 February 1943 in Oban) is a Scottish Labour Party politician. She was a Member of the Scottish Parliament (MSP) for the Highlands and Islands region from 1999 until 2007.

Prior to her election she worked as a teacher of English at Millburn Academy in Inverness and in a voluntary capacity with Ross-shire Women's Aid of which she was a founding member.  Apart from her work in her native Highlands, she is particularly credited as being the force behind the Protection from Abuse (Scotland) Act 2001 which extended protection of victims of domestic violence to unmarried couples.  The Bill was promoted by the then Scottish Parliament Justice and Home Affairs Committee and became the first Committee Bill ever to be enacted into law by the Scottish Parliament.

References

External links
 
Maureen MacMillan MSP profile at the site of Scottish Labour

1943 births
Living people
People from Oban
Scottish schoolteachers
Labour MSPs
Members of the Scottish Parliament 1999–2003
Members of the Scottish Parliament 2003–2007
Female members of the Scottish Parliament
20th-century Scottish women politicians